Cape Henry Parish is a broad headland in the Wandel Sea, Arctic Ocean, northernmost Greenland. Administratively it is part of the Northeast Greenland National Park.

History
In 1900 Peary explored the north coast of Greenland from Cape Washington in the west to a place he named Wyckoff Island in the east, on the way reaching Cape Morris Jesup, the northernmost point of mainland Greenland. Cape Henry Parish was visible in the distance and was named by Robert Peary after banker Henry Parish (1829-1917), President of the New York Life Insurance & Trust Co., and one of the founding members of the Peary Arctic Club in New York.

This headland was marked on Robert Peary's map of the eastern coast of North Greenland as guesswork, based on sighting of two headlands from Wyckoff Land, for the visibility was marred by fog. Cape Henry Parish was finally charted with accuracy by J.P. Koch during the 1906-07 Danmark Expedition.

Geography
Cape Henry Parish is located at the northern end of Herlufsholm Strand, in the eastern shore of Peary Land,  to the NW of Cape Eiler Rasmussen, Peary Land's easternmost point.

References

External links
 Congressional Record - Senate

Parish
Peary Land